Achada is a parish on the island of São Miguel, Azores.

Achada may also refer to:

Achada Furna, a village on the island of Fogo, Cape Verde
Achada Grande, a village on Fogo, Cape Verde
Achada Fazenda, a village on the island of Santiago, Cape Verde
Achada Leitão, a village on the island of Santiago, Cape Verde
Achada Monte, a village on the island of Santiago, Cape Verde
Achada Tenda, a village on the island of Santiago, Cape Verde
Achada Igreja, an alternative name for the town Picos, Cape Verde, on the island of Santiago
Ribeira da Achada, a stream and a settlement on the island of Madeira

See also
Achadinha ("little Achada"), São Miguel Island, Azores